, the Fort Wayne–Huntington–Auburn Combined Statistical Area (CSA), or Fort Wayne Metropolitan Area, or Northeast Indiana is a federally designated metropolitan area consisting of eight counties in northeast Indiana (Adams, Allen, DeKalb, Huntington, Noble, Steuben, Wells, and Whitley counties), anchored by the city of Fort Wayne. 

The CMSA is further divided into one metropolitan area (Fort Wayne) and six Micropolitan Areas ([Angola, Auburn, Bluffton, Decatur, Huntington, Kendallville). As of the 2020 census, the CMSA had a population of 645,409 The Fort Wayne metropolitan area is part of the Northern Indiana region, containing about 2.2 million people, and is considered part of the Great Lakes Megalopolis, which contains an estimated 59 million people.

Combined Statistical Area

Metropolitan Statistical Area (MSA)
Fort Wayne (Allen and Whitley counties)

Micropolitan Statistical Areas (μSAs)

Angola (Stueben County)
Auburn (DeKalb County)
Bluffton (Wells County)
Decatur (Adams County)
Huntington (Huntington County)
Kendallville (Noble County)

Communities

Places with more than 100,000 inhabitants
Fort Wayne (Principal city)

Places with 10,000 to 100,000 inhabitants

Auburn
Bluffton
Huntington
Kendallville
New Haven

Places with 1,000 to 10,000 inhabitants

Albion
Andrews
Angola
Avilla
Berne
Butler
Churubusco
Clear Lake
Columbia City
Corunna
Decatur
Fremont
Garrett
Geneva
Grabill
Hamilton
Huntertown
Leo-Cedarville
Ligonier
Markle
Monroeville
Mount Etna
Ossian
Roanoke
Rome City
Saint Joe
South Whitley
Warren
Waterloo
Woodburn

Places with fewer than 1,000 inhabitants

Altona
Ashley
Cromwell
Hudson
Larwill
Monroe
Orland
Poneto
Uniondale
Vera Cruz
Wolcottville
Zanesville

Census-designated places (CDPs)

Harlan
Hoagland
Kimmell
Tri-Lakes

Townships

Adams County

 Blue Creek
 French
 Hartford
 Jefferson
 Kirkland
 Monroe
 Preble
 Root
 Saint Marys
 Union
 Wabash
 Washington

Allen County

Aboite Township
Adams Township
Cedar Creek Township
Eel River Township
Jackson Township
Jefferson Township
Lafayette Township
Lake Township
Madison Township
Marion Township
Maumee Township
Milan Township
Monroe Township
Perry Township
Pleasant Township
St. Joseph Township
Scipio Township
Springfield Township
Washington Township
Wayne Township

Wells County

 Chester Township
 Harrison Township
 Jackson Township
 Jefferson Township
 Lancaster Township
 Liberty Township
 Nottingham Township
 Rockcreek Township
 Union Township

Whitley County

 Cleveland Township
 Columbia Township
 Etna-Troy Township
 Jefferson Township
 Richland Township
 Smith Township
 Thorncreek Township
 Union Township
 Washington Township

Notable residents
 Chris Schenkel, former Sportscaster for ABC Sports. Born in Bippus.

See also

 Northern Indiana

References

External links
2003 American Community Survey, U.S. Census Bureau
Fort Wayne MSA statistics by Indiana Business Research Center

 
Indiana census statistical areas
Geography of Fort Wayne, Indiana